Zanola is a genus of moths in the family Apatelodidae.

Species
Kitching et al. 2018 lists the following species for the genus:
 Zanola aegina (Stoll, 1782)
 Zanola elongata Schaus, 1910
 Zanola fieldi Schaus, 1910
 Zanola impedita Dognin, 1916
 Zanola lychnica Dognin, 1920
 Zanola poecila Draudt, 1929
 Zanola verago (Cramer, 1777)

References

 

Apatelodidae
Moth genera